MTV Roadies X : Battle for Glory is the tenth season of MTV Roadies, a reality television show aired on MTV India. The auditions started on 31 October 2012 and were held in Pune, Delhi, Chandigarh and Hyderabad. The show started airing on MTV India from 19 January 2013 with new episodes airing every Saturday at 7:00 pm IST.

The series was won by veteran roadie Palak Johal, originally from Season 6, of Team Raghu. She won the title on 11 May 2013. Her grand price included a total cash price of ₹ 450,000, a Hero Impulse bike and an HP laptop.

Format
For the tenth season, the show changed its format. The contestants were divided into two teams - Rannvijay's team composed of participants selected in the audition, and Raghu's team composed of contestants who appeared on previous versions of the series. 16 ex-roadies were shortlisted with the list released on the show's official Facebook page and Twitter account consisting of Nihal Nikam, Roopali Anand, Anmol Singh, Avtar Nischal, Renee Dhyani, Kanak Raju, Anirudh Sharma, Palak Johal, Diyali Chauhan, Mohit Saggar, Devarshi Patel, Tamanna Sharma, Suchit Singh, Pooja Bannerjee, Roop Bhinder and Shambhavi Sharma. After surviving periodic cuts 8 roadies emerged to join the official list of contestants. A new format for elimination was also adopted where the contestant(s), getting the most votes in a vote-out, from either team are sent to battle each other or opponents from the opposing team. The loser is consequently ousted from the show.

The season's theme song is "Jajabor" - a collaboration between singer Papon and Raghu, and sung in Assamese and Hindi.

Destination

Roadies' selection
The auditions started on 31 October 2012 in Pune, followed with auditions in Delhi (4 November 2012), Chandigarh (17 November 2012) and Hyderabad (20 November 2012).

Newcomers

Veterans

Overall Count:

Contestants
There were sixteen contestants overall.

The Total Votes is the number of votes a roadie has received during Vote-outs where the roadie is eligible to be eliminated from the game. It does not include the votes received during the finale where the finalists are voted for the win.

The Journey

Episode 1 - Delhi → Kohima

The episode began with the introduction of all the roadies of Ranvijay's Team in traditional Nagaland custom who were selected for the journey .One by the one all the roadies were introduced with flashbacks from their PI's which told whats the reason for their selection, whats their personality like and what would be their future in Ranvijays team.  He introduced the winner of roadies battleground 5 Abhimanyu  and told him to challenge anyone to swap with his position in the team he picked Gaurav and  he lost to Gaurav and had to leave the show . team remains unchanged . Raghu makes a surprise entry and introduces his team and the initial reaction of ranvijay's team  was that they were pretty impressed by opposition. Back at hotel Raghu team since were seniors and EX-ROADIES plans a ragging attempt which backfires and ends in an argument between the contestants of the Raghu team.  
The second day begins with both teams entering to a task locations. The task turns out to be a Money task in which 50,000 would get added into the winner teams account. Raghu's team agreed to perform first and they finished at a score of 255 .Ranvijay team completed the task with 2 penalties therefore 20% was reduced from there score but they still surprised everyone by winning the task with just 1 pt extra that is 256 the original score being 320. The Raghu team seemed surprised that they ending up being losers at their first task. Raghu told them their overconfidence and lack of co-ordination was the main reason for the loss. At night both team were surprised when the heard the arrival of a common roadies prop the Black box.

Episode 2 - Kohima
 Most votes : Geetika and Jahid; Mohit and Diyali
 Sent to elimination challenge: Geetika and Mohit; Jahid and Diyali
 Eliminated : Jahid and Diyali

Episode 3 - Kohima → Mokokchung 

Money Task
Girls from either team competed against each other. Geetika from Rannvijay's team sat out of the challenge to balance competitors on both sides. 
 Results:

Immunity Task
Boys from both teams competed against each other. Avtar from Raghu's team sat out of the challenge to balance competitors on both sides. 
 Results:

 Most votes : Sonal and Vikas
 Sent to elimination challenge: Ramandeep and Vikas
 Eliminated : Vikas

Episode 4 -  Mokokchung → Jorhat

Money Task
The task involved a spinwheel labeled with Strip, Brazilian wax, Enema and Paint ball shot. The contestants were given a quiz, and with every wrong answer one of the boys would have the penalty of one of the tasks from the spinwheel.

 Voluntary entered the casket: Sonal; Palak

Episode 5 -  Jorhat
 Most votes : Geetika; Roop
 Sent to elimination challenge: Sonal and Geetika; Roop and Palak
 Eliminated : Geetika
 Withdrew : Avtar

Episode 6 -  Jorhat → Tezpur

Money Task
Girls from either team were pitted against each other in a boxing challenge where each winner from a pairing would win ₹ 50,000 for her team and the overall best performer a Hero Impulse Bike. 
 Results:

 Most votes : Roop and Anirudh 
 Sent to elimination challenge: Roop and Anirudh
 Eliminated : Roop

Episode 7 - Tezpur → Bhalukpung

Captaincy Challenge
The winners of the captaincy challenge was given the power to choose a new team Raghu and Rannvijay.Sonal from Team Rannvijay and Suchit from Team Raghu won their respective challenge.
Team Swap:
 New Team Raghu : Suchit, Mohit, Palak, Harmeet and Swati
New Team Rannvijay: Sonal, Gaurav, Ramandeep, Roopali and Anirudh

Episode 8 - Bhalukpung
Money Task

The possession of the respective accumulated money by either team was decided. The team captains guessed the how many arrows their teammates could fire into a sand sack; the captain who guessed the closest would take the larger lot of money regardless of the initial team who collected it.

Coincidentally both team gained equal points. Therefore, the possession of accumulated money was then decided by successful number of hit on the sand sack by each captain out of best of 5 shots. Suchit hit the target first three shots successfully, however Sonal was unable to manage even one. Consequently, Raghu team managed to collect the bigger lot of money.

 Most votes : Roopali and Gaurav; Mohit and Suchit
 Sent to elimination challenge: Roopali and Suchit; Mohit and Gaurav
 Eliminated : Roopali and Suchit

Episode 9 - Bhalukpung → Bomdila 
Money Task

 Most votes : Ramandeep and Swati
 Sent to elimination challenge: Ramandeep and Swati
 Eliminated : Swati

Episode 10 - Bomdila → Tawang
Tawang, being the final destination for journey, brings the last elimination before the finale. For this a "shopping" task is given to the roadies; and to balance teams, Ramandeep from team Ranvijay sits out due to a 3-1 vote against her for participating in this task. Surprisingly, she gets immunity right away and becomes the first contestant to make it to the finale.
For the task, contestant from each team are required to obtain as valuable commodities as possible from the money given. [Money Task, 1.5L] Also, they are required to complete their tasks and meet their respective mentors (Raghu and Ranvijay) as soon as possible. [Immunity Task] Team Ranvijay wins both these tasks, and subsequently gets immune to reach the finale.
In the vote-out, contestants Harry, Mohit and Palak are required to suggest the contestant who won't go to the battle for elimination, and would automatically qualify for the finale. Palak wins this vote out.
In the battle, Harry and Mohit compete against each other in the task similar to roadies 6 finale. Harry gets eliminated, and Mohit joins Palak in team Raghu for the finale.

 Most votes : Harry and Mohit
 Sent to elimination challenge: Harry and Mohit
 Eliminated : Harry

Episode 11 -Semifinal
The final 6 finalists meet again for finale but first they will 1st meet the old contestants who they have dumped so far to reach finale. Ranvijay decides to nominate two players from his team by a game known as chess boxing: 4 finalists will be divided into the team of two. Raman chooses no-one, Anirudh chooses Sonal, Sonal chooses Gaurav, Gaurav chooses Sonal, so making the final team like this Anirudh-Raman, Gaurav-Sonal. For the task girls will start with a chess and simultaneously boys will fight a boxing match in a ring, each move in a chess will consist of 20 sec. otherwise the player will miss a turn, to win the task either one should knock out the opponent in boxing first or check-mate the other player in chess, game will be timed for 2 min., after 2 min, boys will play chess and girls boxing. Sonal and Gaurav lost the task and got eliminated while Anirudh and Raman qualified for the next level.

 Sent to elimination challenge: Anirudh and Ramandeep; Sonal and Gaurav
 Eliminated : Sonal and Gaurav

Episode 12 - Finale

Palak, Raman, Mohit and Anirudh met for their finale task. The contenders are teamed up with their dream competitors as called out by them in the finale part 1 episode. Mohit and Anirudh are one team and Palak With Raman are one team. The team task is for one member to fetch 10 glasses of honey climbing a rope one at a time within 5 minutes, while the other tastes a very spicy chili from northeastern part of India. As an advantage to the female team members, the male team has to carry 10 kg extra weight while they climb the rope to fetch the glass of honey. Mohit fetched 6 glasses of honey after Anirudh ate the chili. Where as Palak fetches 8 glasses after Raman ate the chilli on her team and Wins the task thus Raman and Palak enter the Final finale task.

The final task between Palak and Raman is a time task to fetch a hammer at the bottom of a water tank without breathing and hit the gong above the water tank, they are also chained and the keys are at the bottom of the tank. Raman reveals that she is aqua-phobic but still continues the task and completes it. Palak completes the task faster than Ramandeep and is announced the winner.

 Eliminated: Anirudh and Mohit; Ramandeep
 Winner: Palak

The Game
Key:
  Team Rannvijay
  Team Raghu

Voting History

Italized font indicates ineligible votes which were used to break a tie.

 According to the scroll selected by Palak prior to the vote-out the maximum vote getter shall become safe and will replace themselves with a member from their team to face the other in the elimination challenge. Consequently, Sonal chose Ramandeep to battle against Vikas.
 Originally Palak lost the battle of survival against Roop however Avtar nominated himself for elimination to save Palak and hence switched places with her.

  Nominated to battle opponent(s) in an elimination challenge where the loser is ousted from the show.

Roadies' Presence
 Key
  – The Contestant won the Competition
  – Contestant eliminated as a result of losing a task against an opponent
  – Contestant forfeited the competition to save an eliminated one.

 indicates that the Roadie was present in the episode.
 indicates that the Roadie was absent in the episode.
 indicates that the roadies was present in the episode but as a part of the audience for watching the Finale rather than as a contestant for the title.

References

External links 
 MTV Roadies Official Website
 MTV Roadies X THEME SONG JAJABOR

MTV Roadies
2013 Indian television seasons